The 2021 Swiss Women's Curling Championship, Switzerland's national women's curling championship, was held from February 6 to 13 at the Curlingzentrum Region Basel in Arlesheim, Switzerland. The winning Silvana Tirinzoni rink then played against the 2020 Swiss champion Elena Stern rink for the right represent Switzerland at the 2021 World Women's Curling Championship.

The event was held between four teams playing in a triple round robin. The top two teams played a best of three to determine the winner while the bottom two teams played in the bronze medal game. Team Silvana Tirinzoni finished the event with a perfect 11–0 record and defeated Team Elena Stern two games to zero in the best of three final.

Teams
The teams are listed as follows:

Round-robin standings
Final round-robin standings

Round-robin results
All draw times are listed in Central European Time (UTC+01:00).

Draw 1
Saturday, February 6, 7:30 pm

Draw 2
Sunday, February 7, 2:00 pm

Draw 3
Monday, February 8, 9:00 am

Draw 4
Monday, February 8, 7:30 pm

Draw 5
Tuesday, February 9, 2:00 pm

Draw 6
Wednesday, February 10, 9:00 am

Draw 7
Wednesday, February 10, 7:30 pm

Draw 8
Thursday, February 11, 2:00 pm

Draw 9
Friday, February 12, 9:00 am

Bronze medal game
Saturday, February 13, 9:00 am

Championship Round

Game 1
Friday, February 12, 7:30 pm

Game 2
Saturday, February 13, 9:00 am

References

External links

Curling competitions in Switzerland
Arlesheim
Swiss Women's Curling Championship
Sport in Basel
Swiss Women's Curling Championship
Swiss Women's Curling Championship
2021 in Swiss women's sport